The 1995 Macau Grand Prix Formula Three was the 42nd Macau Grand Prix race to be held on the streets of Macau on 19 November 1995. It was the twelfth edition for Formula Three cars. Ralf Schumacher of WTS Racing, brother of 1990 winner Michael Schumacher, won the 15-lap race, which was shortened because of a fourteen-car accident at San Francisco Bend turn on the second leg's first lap that was caused by Norberto Fontana running wide and hitting the wall beside the track, sending him back into the path of other cars. Ralf Schumacher was the third German to win the race in the past three editions after Jörg Müller won the 1993 iteration and Sascha Maassen won the 1994 race. Jarno Trulli finished in second for KMS and TOM'S driver Pedro de la Rosa was third.

As of 2019, Schumacher is the last Macau GP winner to have won a Formula One race.  

Future three-time Indianapolis 500 winner Hélio Castroneves also made a start in this event. His crash at Mandarin Bend in lap 3 of the resumed second leg leads the decision of  cancellation of the second leg.

Entry list

Race

References

External links
 The official website of the Macau Grand Prix

 Youtube clip of massive pileup on first lap F3 MACAU START 1995

Macau Grand Prix
Grand
Macau